The 34th Blue Dragon Film Awards ceremony was held at Kyung Hee University's Peace Palace Hall in Seoul on November 22, 2013. It was broadcast on SBS and was hosted by Kim Hye-soo and Yoo Jun-sang.

Nominations and winners
Complete list of nominees and winners:

(Winners denoted in bold)

Gallery

References

2013 film awards
34th
2013 in South Korean cinema